Dunthorne may refer to:
 Richard Dunthorne, English astronomer and surveyor
 Dunthorne (crater)